Ist das alles? (13 Höhepunkte mit den Ärzten) [Is that all? (13 highlights with Die Ärzte)] is the fifth album by German rock band Die Ärzte. It is their first best-of album.

This album was released because after the indexing of Die Ärzte and Debil, only Im Schatten der Ärzte was left on the store shelves. With this album, songs from the indexed albums could also be released to a wider audience.

Track listing 
 "Gehn wie ein Ägypter" (Die Ärzte/Liam Sternberg) - 2:21 (German version of "Walk like an Egyptian")
 "Du willst mich küssen" [You want to kiss me] - 3:09
 "2000 Mädchen" [2000 girls] - 3:56
 "Mysteryland (Remix)" - 3:58
 "Zu spät (Maxi-Version)" [Too late] - 6:51
 "El Cattivo (1987 Bad Boy-Mix)" [Bad (in Italian)] - 3:13
 "Radio brennt" [Radio burns] - 2:42
 "Alleine in der Nacht" [Alone in the night] - 3:09
 "Buddy Holly's Brille" [Buddy Holly's glasses] - 3:35
 "Dein Vampyr (Remix)" [Your vampyre] - 3:09
 "Erna P." (Urlaub/Urlaub) - 2:29
 "Wie am ersten Tag (Remix)" [Like on the first day] - 3:40
 "Ist das alles? (Maxi Remix)" [Is that all?] - 5:33

Song information 
 Tracks 1, 3, 7 are new.
 New version from 1987 of "El Cattivo" from Debil
 Track 11 from "Paul"
 Track 5 from "Zu spät (Special Maxi)"
 Tracks 2, 9 and the original version of "Dein Vampyr" from Im Schatten der Ärzte
 Track 8 and the original versions of "Mysteryland", "Wie am ersten Tag" and "Ist das alles?" from Die Ärzte
 "Ist das alles?" (Maxi Remix) includes a rendition of the "Sympathy for the Devil" solo by The Rolling Stones.

The chart table
The back cover and the booklet feature fake joke-charts. The first thirteen songs make up the track list for the album, referring to the title of the album. The other part consists of other popular songs from the time, which are all, either by artist's name or song's title, referred to in "Radio brennt"; including a fake cover of "Geronimos Cadillac" by Die Ärzte.

Top 20 Charts

Singles 
1987: "Gehn wie ein Ägypter"
1987: "2000 Mädchen"
1987: "Radio brennt"

Personnel
Farin Urlaub - guitar, vocals
Bela Felsenheimer - drums, vocals
Hans Runge - bass guitar on 2, 5, 6, 9, 11
Hagen Liebing - bass guitar on 1, 3, 4, 7, 8, 10

Producers
Manne Praeker: 1, 8, 12
Micki Meuser: 2, 9
Die Ärzte + Hoffmann: 3, 6
Manne Praeker; remixed by Die Ärzte + Hoffmann: 4
Die Ärzte: 5, 11
Micki Meuser; remixed by Die Ärzte + Hoffmann: 10
Manne Praeker; maxi-remix by Die Ärzte + Hoffmann: 13

Charts

Die Ärzte compilation albums
1987 compilation albums